Network analysis can refer to: 
 Network theory, the analysis of relations through mathematical graphs
 Social network analysis, network theory applied to social relations
 Network analysis (electrical circuits)

See also
Network planning and design

es:Análisis de redes
pt:Análise de rede
ru:Сетевой анализ